Dushintsi is a village in western Bulgaria in the municipality of Breznik, Pernikdistrict. The village is situated in a mountainous region, nestled in the northeast mountainside of Golemi Vrah. It had not been mentioned in any registers until the Liberation of Bulgaria in 1878.

Name
Its name is derived from the personal name Dusha, a version of Dusho.

References

Villages in Pernik Province